Sir Thomas Hope, 1st Baronet Hope of Craighall (1573–1646) was a Scottish lawyer, and Lord Advocate under Charles I.

Life
He was the son of an eminent Edinburgh merchant, Henry Hope, and his French wife, Jacqueline de Tott, her parents of Swedish origin. His grandfather John Hope was an Edinburgh merchant of French origin.

Admitted as an advocate in 1605, he made his reputation in 1606 defending John Forbes, and five other ministers at Linlithgow who were charged with high treason. In 1608 he was on a team of lawyers, described as "the most learned and best experienced" who defended Margaret Hartsyde, a servant of Anne of Denmark accused of stealing her jewels.

He prepared the deed revoking James VI's grants of church property in 1625. He was appointed Lord Advocate under Charles I in 1626, and held the office until 1641. He was created a Baronet of Nova Scotia on 11 February 1628.

Hope worked for landowners, including Mary, Countess of Home, and Marie Stewart, Countess of Mar. He conducted the case against John Elphinstone, 2nd Lord Balmerino in 1634. As Lord High Commissioner to the General Assembly of the Church of Scotland in 1643, he maintained the king's temporising policy.

In 1645 Hope was appointed one of the Commissioners for managing the Exchequer, but died the next year.

He is buried in Greyfriars Kirkyard in Edinburgh. The grave lies in the north-west section of the original graveyard, against the west wall.

His Cowgate home, built in 1616, was demolished in 1887 to make way for the Edinburgh Free Library.

Related Works
His "Practical Observations Upon divers titles of the Law of Scotland", commonly called the "Minor Practicks", were published in 1726, by Alexander Bayne.

In 1843 the Bannatyne Club published A Diary of the Public Correspondence of Sir Thomas Hope of Craighall, 1633–1645: From the Original, in the Library at Pinkie House, a collection Hope's official and private correspondence from the last twelve years of his life.

Family
Hope married Elizabeth Bennet, daughter of John Binning or Bennet of Wallyford, Haddingtonshire.  The couple had the following children:
John Hope, Lord Craighall (1605?–1654)
Thomas Hope, Lord Kerse (1606–1643)
William, died young
Henry, died young
Sir Alexander Hope of Grantham/Granton (1611–1680), Carver Extraordinary and cup-bearer to Charles I.   
Sir James Hope of Hopetoun (1614–1661), progenitor of the Earls of Hopetoun
David, died young
Patrick, died young
Charles, died young
Elizabeth, died young
Margaret, died young
Mary/Marie, mother of Sir Charles Erskine, 1st Baronet of Alva
Elizabeth, died unmarried
Anne/Anna, married David Erskine, 2nd Lord Cardross

Of the four sons who survived infancy, three of these later qualified as advocates: John, Thomas and James. Two of these sons were elevated to judges in the Supreme Court.

Two of his sons were appointed to the bench while Hope was Lord Advocate; and it being judged by the Court of Session unbecoming that a father should plead uncovered before his children, the privilege of wearing his hat, while pleading, was granted to him. This privilege his successors in the office of Lord Advocate have in theory ever since enjoyed.

Historical fiction
 Sir Thomas Hope is the subject of Nigel Tranter's last novel, Hope Endures (2005).

References

Attribution

External links
Article on Sir Thomas Hope

1573 births
1646 deaths
Thomas
Lord Advocates
Baronets in the Baronetage of Nova Scotia
Lords High Commissioner to the General Assembly of the Church of Scotland
Members of the Faculty of Advocates
Scottish knights
17th-century Scottish people
17th-century Scottish politicians
Members of the Convention of the Estates of Scotland 1630
Members of the Parliament of Scotland 1639–1641
Members of the Parliament of Scotland 1628–1633
Burials at Greyfriars Kirkyard